Moder is a forest floor type formed under mixed-wood and pure deciduous forests. Moder is a kind of humus whose properties are the transition between :mor humus and mull humus types. Moders are similar to mors as they are made up of partially to fully humified organic components accumulated on the mineral soil. Compared to mulls, moders are zoologically active. In addition, moders present as in the middle of mors and mulls with a higher decomposition capacity than mull but lower than mor. Moders are characterized by a slow rate of litter decomposition by litter-dwelling organisms and fungi, leading to the accumulation of organic residues. Moder humus forms share the features of the mull and mor humus forms.

Properties 
Moders develop in semiarid, temperate, and Mediterranean climates. Moders' chemical characteristics show low acidity, total carbon, carbon-nitrogen ratio, cation exchange capacity, and high total nitrogen and base saturation. Moders have a higher availability of nutrients than mors.

Formation of moder humus forms  
Morders form in deciduous forest situations when the soil has few micro-organisms, bacteria, and invertebrates, such as earthworms, to decompose the organic matter on the soil surface. The organic matter accumulation horizon could identify by capitalized letters. It is generally possible to observe three distinct "sub-layers" or horizons designated by the litter (L) *, fermentation (F) *, and humus (H) * layers.

Identify different layers for moder 
"L" litter: A horizon is defined by accumulating primary leaves (and needles), twigs, and woody materials, with the original structures visible.

"F" Fermentation: A horizon defined by the buildup of partially decomposed organic matter generated primarily from leaves, twigs, and woody materials. Some of the original structures are difficult to identify, and materials may have been pounded into small pieces or particles in part by soil fauna, as in a "MODER".

"H" Humus: A horizon defined by the accumulation of disintegrated organic matter in which the original structures are undetectable. It differs from the "F" horizon as more humification due to organisms' actions. It can partially merge into the mineral soil such as the "MODER".

The Fa horizon is used to distinguish moder. These layers are mostly made up of partially decomposed plant remains broken or comminuted by soil fauna and are loosely organized rather than matted like the Fq horizons. An abundance of fine roots can sometimes result in a matte appearance. A distinctive aspect of the Fa horizon and its loose nature is the abundance of soil fauna droppings, which can be seen with high magnification. Centipedes, millipedes, collembola, mites, isopods, and various insect larvae all come from these droppings. The fragmentation of plant residues by soil fauna facilitates a faster rate of decomposition. Bacteria, actinomycetes, and protozoa are progressively contributing to the breakdown process, although fungi continue to play an important role

Soil fauna break plant residues into non-compact, loose arrangements mainly constituted of faunal droppings, which make up friable Fz horizons in moders. The moder order, like mors, accumulates organic matter above the mineral horizons. Fungal mycelia are reasonably expected, and plant residues may appear somewhat matted. However, many small insect droppings can still be observed. In most Moder humus types, H d horizons can be observed. However,mor humus types might have similar horizons. This trait is not considered diagnostic of Moders. H horizons have no distinct, differentiating characteristics that would indicate whether they are from Mors or Moders, according to the observation of humus from micro-morphology.

Moder humus form may include only the Ah horizon or ectorganic horizons below end- organic horizons. Fine humus elements have permeated the mineral soil on this horizon. Although soil animals may carry organic matter into the upper region of this horizon, this will only happen over a short distance. The upper limit of the Ah horizon is often gradual.

References 

Forest ecology
Soil biology